David Muñoz Pueyo (born 9 July 1997) is a Spanish footballer who plays for CD Sariñena as a forward.

Club career
After playing for lowly Olivar CF, Muñoz moved to Real Zaragoza, and progressed through the youth setup. On 16 July 2014 he was called up to the main squad, and also took part of the club's pre-season matches.

On 23 August 2014, before even having appeared for the B-side, Muñoz made his professional debut, starting in a 0–0 draw at Recreativo de Huelva in the Segunda División championship. The following 14 July he signed for Málaga CF, being initially assigned to the reserves in Tercera División.

References

External links

1997 births
Living people
Spanish footballers
Footballers from Zaragoza
Association football forwards
Segunda División players
Segunda División B players
Tercera División players
Real Zaragoza B players
Real Zaragoza players
Atlético Malagueño players
UD Logroñés B players
CD Sariñena players